Józef Czyrek (20 July 1928 – 3 June 2013) was a Polish politician who served as the minister of foreign affairs of the People's Republic of Poland from 1980 to 1982.

Early life and education
Czyrek was born in Białobrzegi, in the Lwów Voivodeship of Poland, in 1928. He graduated with a bachelor's degree in economics from Jagiellonian University in 1950.

Career
Czyrek began his career as a researcher at Jagiellonian University and Cracow University of Economics. In 1952 he joined the ministry of foreign affairs. He was a member of the Politburo of the Polish United Workers' party to which he joined in 1955. He served as the counsel in Belgrade (1962–1968) and deputy director as well as director of studies and programming department at the ministry of foreign affairs (1969–1971).

He was the deputy minister of foreign affairs until August 1980. He was appointed minister of foreign affairs in August 1980, replacing Emil Wojtaszek in the post. In 1981 he was named as the member of the party's secretariat. Czyrek's tenure as minister of foreign affairs ended in 1982. In December 1982, he was appointed vice-president of the Patriotic Movement for National Rebirth (PRON). Czyrek also acted as top aide to the Polish president and general secretary of the communist party Wojciech Jaruzelski. Czyrek participated in round table talks between the ruling party and opposition figures that lasted from 6 February to 4 April 1989.

His term as top aide ended on 30 July 1989 when Jaruzelski resigned from the leadership of the communist party. Czyrek also resigned from the communist party's central committee on that date.

Death
Czyrek died on 3 June 2013.

References

External links

1928 births
2013 deaths
Burials at Powązki Military Cemetery
People from Łańcut County
People from Lwów Voivodeship
Polish People's Party (1945–1949) politicians
United People's Party (Poland) politicians
Members of the Politburo of the Polish United Workers' Party
Ministers of Foreign Affairs of Poland
Members of the Polish Sejm 1985–1989
Polish Round Table Talks participants
20th-century Polish economists
Jagiellonian University alumni
Academic staff of Jagiellonian University
Commanders with Star of the Order of Polonia Restituta
Commanders of the Order of Polonia Restituta
Knights of the Order of Polonia Restituta
Recipients of the Order of the Banner of Work
Recipients of the Gold Cross of Merit (Poland)